R. S. Kushwaha is an Indian politician from the Lakhimpur constituency of Uttar Pradesh. R. S. Kushwaha is currently a member of the Samajwadi Party (SP) and has previously held the post of the national general secretary of Bahujan Samaj Party (BSP).  He has also served as the president of the Uttar Pradesh state unit of the party during the time of Alliance between Samajwadi Party and Bahujan Samaj Party. He defected to SP in October, 2021. He was the member of the 14th Legislative Assembly of Uttar Pradesh and a member of Uttar Pradesh Legislative Assembly from 2010 to 2016. He also contested the 15th Lok Sabha Elections against congress chief Sonia Gandhi from Rae Bareli constituency.

Posts Held

See also
 Nighasan (Assembly constituency)
 Uttar Pradesh Legislative Assembly
 Uttar Pradesh Legislative Council
 Bahujan Samaj Party

References

Uttar Pradesh politicians
People from Lakhimpur Kheri district
Bahujan Samaj Party politicians from Uttar Pradesh
Living people
People from Raebareli
Year of birth missing (living people)
Samajwadi Party politicians